The abbey of Saint-Ausone is a Benedictine abbey founded in Angouleme in the Charente in the 11th century.

History of the Abbey 
Ausone would have been the first bishop of Angouleme. His burial would be on the edge of the city at the site where the Benedictine abbey of women took place.

Foundation of the Abbey 
It is placed under the aegis of St Ausone and its term "Sepultus in confinio urbis, in occidental parte."

The ladies of Saint Ausona kept their monastery of Saint Calfagia, contemporary of Saint Ausonius, the first bishop of Angouleme. The monastery was created at the bottom of the ramparts, near the tomb of Saint Ausone.

Evolution of status 
It is a Benedictine abbey of women.
In memory of Saint Ausone the entrance of the bishops in Angoulême was done in procession of the monastery of Saint-Ausone until the cathedral.

The illegitimate daughter of Charles d'Orleans, Madeleine was abbess of 1476 to 1543.

Loss of Religious Function 
In 1792 (following the French Revolution), the church and the Abbey of the Benedictines were disused and transformed into a prison.
The buildings were used for a Central School which then became a college and then a high school. In 1844, it was decided to shave everything to rebuild a new high school and better adapted to the plans of the architect Paul Abadie snr. The present chapel was built between 1862 and 1867 by Paul Abadie Jr on the site of the parish church of the late 18th century.

Before the reconstruction of the church of Saint-Ausone in 1864 excavations took place which allowed the discovery of sarcophagi. Today There's nothing left of the Monastic buildings
The parish church was rebuilt on the site of the abbey. Located below and outside the ramparts, it forms with the archive one of the buildings of the archbishopric. They also include a cloister and numerous annexes including a dovecote.

Abbots
 11??-1152 : Sainte Caléfagie
 1152-1222 : Alix I
 1222-1225 : Agnès I de Pons
 1225-1260 : Agnès II de Chambon
 1260-1261 : Marguerite I de Mixe de Luxe
 1261-1284 : Guillemette de Villars
 1285-1306 : Isabelle I
 1307-1311 : Gillette
 1311-1312 : Barthélémie I
 1312-1324 : Alix II de Lusignan de La Marche
 1324-1332 : Pétronille I de La Caille
 1333-1338 : Isabelle II du Tison d’Argence
 1338-1370 : Barthélémie II Geoffroide de Saint-Amand
 1370-1383 : Aude
 1384-1392 : Agnès III
 1393-1395 : Jeanne I
 1395-1448 : Agnès IV de Montferrand
 1449-1453 : Marguerite II de Ragos
 1454-1461 : Marguerite III des Aigues
 1461-1489 : Marguerite IV de Gaing
 1489-1490 : Pétronille II de Gaing
 1490-1519 : Madeleine de Valois-Orléans-Angouleme
 1519-1533 : Renée Guibert
 1533-1550 : Marie Paulmier
 1550-1585 : Barbe de Saint-Gelais de Lusignan de Lansac
 1585-1587 : Anne d’Arnaud de Chalonne
 1587-1654 : Luce de Montmorency-Bouteville de Luxe
 1654-1682 : Charlotte-Catherine d’Aure de Gramont
 1682-1686 : Angélique d’Espinay de Lignery
 1686-1711 : Jeanne II de Villelume du Bastiment
 1711-1747 : Françoise-Gabrielle de Valois-Orléans-Rothelin
 1747-1759 : Jeanne II Elisabeth-Thérèse de Pérusse des Cars de La Renaudie
 1759-1766 : Gabrielle-Marthe de Pérusse des Cars de La Renaudie
 1766-1793 : Marie-Françoise de Durfort de Civrac

References

Angoulême
Benedictine monasteries in France